John Whitney may refer to:

Musicians
John "Charlie" Whitney (born 1944), British rock guitarist
John Whitney, American drummer with City Sleeps
Jon Whitney (DJ), American DJ and musician

Others
John D. Whitney (1850–1917), Jesuit and president of Georgetown University
John Whitney (broadcaster) (born 1930), writer and producer involved in British commercial radio and television
John Hay Whitney (1904–1982), millionaire
John Whitney (industrialist) (1836–1932), New Zealand industrialist
John Whitney (footballer) (1874–?), English footballer
John Whitney (animator) (1917–1995), American animator, composer and inventor
Jon Whitney (footballer) (born 1970), English former footballer

See also
John Witney, British police killer, see Shepherd's Bush murders